Beastmarket Hill is a row of buildings in Nottingham City Centre forming the west side of Old Market Square.

History
Beastmarket Hill derives its name from being the site of the cattle market. It is bounded by St James’ Street to the north west and Friar Lane to the south east.

Notable buildings
1 to 7, Lloyds Bank by Lloyds Bank Architects Department, 1966
8 to 10, Barclays Bank by W.A.S. Lloyd 1959
11 to 13, Burton’s by Harry Wilson, 1923.

References

Buildings and structures in Nottingham
Streets in Nottingham